The Crescent Hotel is a historic hotel at 75 Prospect Avenue in Eureka Springs, Arkansas.  It is billed as "America's most haunted hotel" and offers a ghost tour for a fee. The 1886 Crescent Hotel & Spa is a member of Historic Hotels of America, the official program of the National Trust for Historic Preservation.

History
The Crescent Hotel was built in 1886 as a resort for the rich and famous, but quickly became unmanageable and fell into disrepair. In 1908, it was reopened as the Crescent College and Conservatory for Young Women. This institution closed down in 1924, and then opened again in 1930 as a junior college. After the college closed in 1934, the Crescent was leased as a summer hotel.

In 1937, it got a new owner, Norman G. Baker, who turned the place into a hospital and health resort. Baker, a millionaire inventor and radio personality, styled himself as a doctor, despite having had no medical training. He claimed to have discovered a number of "cures" for various ailments, including cancer, and launched frequent attacks on organized medicine, which he accused of being corrupt and profit-driven.  

Having been run out of Iowa for practicing medicine without a license, Baker moved his cancer patients to Arkansas and advertised his new health resort at the Crescent. His "cure" consisted primarily of drinking the area's natural spring water. In 1940, federal charges were filed against Baker for mail fraud and he spent four years in prison. The Crescent Hotel was left ownerless until 1946. In the spring of 1946, the Crescent Hotel was purchased by John R. Constantine, Herbert E. Shutter, Herbert Byfield, and Dwight Nichols. On March 15, 1967, the hotel was nearly burned to the ground. The only living owner at this time was Dwight Nichols.

In 1997, Marty and Elise Roenigk purchased the Crescent Hotel for $1.3 million. They oversaw a six-year restoration and renovation of the hotel rooms. Marty Roenigk died in a car crash in 2009; Elise Roenigk remains the hotel's current owner.

The building was listed on the National Register of Historic Places in 2016.

In popular culture
In 2007, the hotel was featured on the television show Ghost Hunters where the cast claimed to see what they described as “a full-body apparition” on their thermal imaging camera.

See also

National Register of Historic Places listings in Carroll County, Arkansas

References

External links

 

Haunted hotels
Historic Hotels of America
Hotels in Arkansas
Buildings and structures in Eureka Springs, Arkansas
Reportedly haunted locations in Arkansas
Hotel buildings completed in 1886
1886 establishments in Arkansas
Hotel buildings on the National Register of Historic Places in Arkansas
National Register of Historic Places in Carroll County, Arkansas